Táborsko may refer to:

17607 Táborsko, an asteroid
FC Silon Táborsko, a Czech football club